Valentina Ivanovna Kovpan (28 February 1950, Petroostriv, Kirovohrad Oblast, Ukrainian SSR – 12 May 2006, Lviv, Ukraine) was an archer from the  Soviet Union.

She competed for the Soviet Union in the 1976 Summer Olympics held in Montreal, Quebec, Canada in the individual event where she finished in second place.

References

1950 births
2006 deaths
Ukrainian female archers
Soviet female archers
Olympic archers of the Soviet Union
Olympic silver medalists for the Soviet Union
Archers at the 1976 Summer Olympics
Olympic medalists in archery
Medalists at the 1976 Summer Olympics
Sportspeople from Kirovohrad Oblast